Rhizanthes infanticida is a species of parasitic flowering plant without leaves, stems, roots, or photosynthetic tissue. They grow on roots of the Tetrastigma vine. They are found in the tropical forests of southern Thailand, western Malaysia, and Sumatra. The brown flowers are from 14 to 22 cm across.

References

External links
The Flowering of Australia's Rainforests: A Plant and Pollination Miscellany

Rafflesiaceae